John Joseph Bejshak (September 19, 1909 – December 26, 1969) was a Canadian-born jockey who competed in American Thoroughbred horse racing best known as the rider of 1935 American Horse of the Year, Discovery.

Bejshak was hired by prominent Canadian horseman J. K. L. Ross who brought him to work at his Maryland breeding farm. His contract was sold to Alfred G. Vanderbilt II where he would meet his future father-in-law, trainer Bud Stotler, whose clients included  Vanderbilt and William R. Coe. In 1933 Bejshak rode Coe's colt Pomponius to a fifth-place finish in the Kentucky Derby and to a fourth in the Preakness Stakes. For Vanderbilt and his Sagamore Stable, Bejshak was aboard Discovery for most of his races between 1934 and 1936, winning major handicaps from New York City to Detroit and Chicago and in California.

Plagued by weight gain, Bejshak's career was cut short. He retired from riding in 1936 and in the 1940s went to work for Laurel Park as custodian of the jockey quarters, patrol judge, clerk of scales, and placing judge. He died of a heart attack in 1969 at age sixty.

External links
 John Bejshak's Memorial & photo at Find a Grave

References

1909 births
1969 deaths
American jockeys
Canadian emigrants to the United States
Sportspeople from Montreal